The Bradley BA-200 ATAC (or Bradley ATAC BA-200) was an American homebuilt aircraft that was designed by Bradley Aerospace of Chico, California, introduced in the mid-1990s. The aircraft was intended to be supplied as a kit for amateur construction, but is likely that only one was constructed.

Design and development
The BA-200 was conceived as a follow-on design to the Bradley Aerobat. It was intended to feature two-seats-in-tandem and aerobatic capabilities that included an airframe stressed to +/-15g.

The aircraft was made from all-metal construction.

The manufacturer estimated the construction time from the supplied kit as 200 hours.

Operational history
By 1998 the company reported that one aircraft had been completed and was flying.

In April 2015 no examples were registered in the United States with the Federal Aviation Administration and it is unlikely that any exist any more.

Specifications (BA-200)

See also
List of aerobatic aircraft

References

BA-200
1990s United States sport aircraft
Homebuilt aircraft
Aerobatic aircraft